Gold Star Order is the highest decoration in Vietnam awards and decorations awarded by the Government of Vietnam for a military or civil "personnel who completed exceptional service or organization established excellent achievement for the revolutionary cause of the Party and Nation." The order was established on June 6, 1947 following the decree No. 58/SL by the Government of the Democratic Republic of Vietnam, it was re-established by the Law of Emulation and Reward promulgated on November 26, 2003.

Appearance

According to the 1947 decree, the medal of Gold Star Order consisted of two parts, a five-pointed star in gilt-bronze attached to a red neckband with yellow edge. The 2003 Law proposed a new model of the medal which are composed of three parts, the five-pointed star, the ribbon and the bar symbolizing the Flag of Vietnam.

Criteria
The Gold Star Order is bestowed on the person who has exceptional contribution for the Party and the Nation, for example ones who had participated in the revolutionary movement before 1935 and had occupied the positions of leaders of the Party, the Government or commander in chief of the Vietnam People's Army. If the person began to dedicate for the revolutionary cause and the country after 1945, to be eligible for the Order, that person has to undertake one of the positions of General Secretary of the Party, President of Vietnam, Prime Minister of Vietnam, President of the National Assembly or General of the armed forces before April 30, 1975. The person who brought significant change to the country or had works with deep impact for the society, security and economy of Vietnam is also available for the Gold Star Order. Heads of foreign states who actively contributed to Vietnam are sometimes recognized by the Government of Vietnam with the Gold Star Order. Additionally, the Gold Star Order can be awarded collectively for an organization, civil or military unit, who did excellent achievements for the Party and the Nation.

Notable recipients

Individual

Collective

See also
 Vietnam awards and decorations
 The list of individuals and collectives awarded Gold Star Order (Vietnam)

References

Orders, decorations, and medals of Vietnam
Awards established in 1947
1947 establishments in Vietnam